Gabriel Janowski (born 22 April 1947 in Konstantów) – Polish politician, activist of opposition in People's Republic of Poland, senator of the first term of office of Senate of the Republic of Poland, MP of first, third and fourth term of office of Sejm, from 1991 do 1993 the Minister of Agriculture and Rural Development.

On 20 January 2000, before debate about dismissal of Minister of Treasury Emil Wąsacz Janowski was, as his press secretary said, behaving strangely. As Janowski said it was because some insidiously has given him drugs.

Curiosities
A fragment of Wolność Słowa (Freedom of Word) satiric song by musical group Püdelsi is about Gabriel Janowski - Gabriel Janowski przedawkował proszki, śmiesznie podskakuje, wszystkich dziś całuje (Gabriel Janowski has overdosed drugs, he's funnily jumping and today he kisses everyone).

Footnotes

External links
 Sejm website about his IV term of office
 Text about him in Encyklopedia Solidarności

1947 births
Living people
Agriculture ministers of Poland
Solidarity (Polish trade union) activists
People from Warsaw West County